Atanasio Ballesteros (7 October 1962 – 10 May 2019) was a Spanish lawyer and politician who served as both Deputy and Senator.

References

1962 births
2019 deaths
Spanish politicians